Sonia Backès (née Dos Santos; born 21 May 1976) is a French politician in New Caledonia. She is the current leader of the Caledonian Republicans party and the President of the Provincial Assembly of South Province since May 17, 2019.

In 2022, she was appointed Secretary of State for Citizenship in the Borne government.

Background
Born Sonia Dos Santos, she is the daughter of language teachers. Her grandparents on her father's side were Protestant émigrés from Portugal, fleeing Catholicism and the authoritairian Estado Novo regime of António de Oliveira Salazar, arriving in Nouméa in 1952. She attended the lycée Lapérouse de Nouméa, graduating in 1992. She joined the right-wing RPCR party (Rassemblement pour la Calédonie dans la République) in 1994 at the age of 18. She studied at the precursor of the University of New Caledonia (UNC), the Université française du Pacifique à Nouméa, also gaining a Masters in Mathematics from the University of Pau in France in 1997, and becoming a qualified computer engineer in 2001 after study at the Université Joseph-Fourier and the Institut polytechnique in Grenoble. 

Her first job in Nouméa was at the government DTSI (direction des Technologies et Services de l'Information), while also teaching part time at the UNC. In the mid 2000s she worked in trades unions, notably for the CFE-CGC before quitting in 2008 to enter politics. 

She is married to Éric Backès, and has two children.

Political career
She has been associated with several political parties at territorial and provincial levels, holding portfolios ranging from education and schooling to energy, finance, taxation, the digital economy, and higher education. She was with the RPCR Rally for Caledonia in the Republic until 2004, then the Rassemblement-UMP (The Rally–UMP) (2004-2013). By 2012 she was part of a right faction within the UMP calling for a stronger commitment to anti-independence, or 'loyalist' values. She was suspended by Pierre Frogier in 2013, who said "your political line embodies all the conservatisms and all the archaisms by taking us back 25 years, far from the daring and innovative project that the Rassemblement carries today”. Gaël Yanno and his supporters, including Sonia Backès, created the Caledonian Popular Movement (MPC, Mouvement populaire calédonien) which then won the elections, placing her in a strong position. She moved into the Républicains de Nouvelle-Calédonie (LR-NC) from 2015-2017 and the Républicains calédoniens (RC) from 2017. She became President of the Provincial Assembly of South Province in 2019.

2021
Backès remains strongly opposed to an independent New Caledonia, and this is also the position of her political party. In the runup to a third referendum on independence from France (held in late 2021), she travelled to New York to address the United Nations on 17 June 2021, telling the UN Special Committee on Decolonisation that “in New Caledonia, there is no longer an administering power and a colonised people.”

References 

New Caledonian women in politics
The Rally (New Caledonia) politicians
Living people
1976 births
Members of the Congress of New Caledonia
Union for a Popular Movement politicians
People from Nouméa
New Caledonian people of French descent
French people of Portuguese descent
21st-century French women
Members of the Borne government
Women government ministers of France